Trevor Harley is emeritus chair of Cognitive Psychology. His primary research is in the psychology of language. From 2003 until 2016 he was Head and Dean of the School of Psychology at the University of Dundee, Scotland, United Kingdom. He is author of "The Psychology of Language", currently in its fourth edition, published by Psychology Press, and "Talking the talk", a book about the psychology of language (psycholinguistics) aimed at a more general audience.

Biography

Career

Trevor Harley was born in 1958 in London and grew up near Southampton. He was educated at Price's Grammar School, Fareham. His undergraduate degree was in Natural Sciences at St John's College in the University of Cambridge. He stayed at Cambridge to study for his PhD under the supervision of Brian Butterworth. His PhD was on "Slips of the tongue and what they tell us about speech production".

For his PhD and later research he collected a corpus of several thousand naturally occurring speech errors, and focused on one word substitutes for another (e.g. saying "pass the pepper" instead of "pass the salt"). He concluded that speech production is an interactive, parallel process, leading him to an interest in connectionist modeling, and research on computational modeling, ageing, and metacognition.

After his PhD he took a temporary lectureship at the University of Dundee. He then moved to the University of Warwick, where he stayed until 1996, then moving to a Senior Lectureship at Dundee. He was awarded a personal chair in 2003, and became Head of Department in the same year, and later Dean in 2006.

In addition to his academic work, he is an author of a novel, Dirty old rascal, a fantasy about a cook set in the strange Castle where no misdeed goes unpunished. Harley has published an article, Why the earth is almost flat: Imaging and the death of cognitive psychology. He has recently performed as a stand-up comic, performing at the Edinburgh Fringe in 2013.

Research Interests
Harley's current main research interest is in metacognition, this interest grew out of his research on ageing and his interest in consciousness. More topics about his research on metacognition is covered in his forthcoming book, Cognition: The mindful brain - why we behave as we do.
Another of his research interest includes how we produce language, although he now studies this in the wider context of how we represent meaning, how language is affected by brain damage, and by normal and pathological ageing (e.g. Alzheimer's and Parkinson's diseases). He also works on how we control our own cognition, and how this ability changes with age. Underlying all his research is a belief that the mind is a parallel, interactive computer, best studied by experimentation and computational modeling.  As well as his interest in language and computational modeling, he was also interested in the research of ageing and metacognition.

He is also interested in the weather, and maintains a site about severe weather events in Britain and the British weather in general available from trevorharley.com, calling this role as a "psychometeorologist". He also carries out psychological research about the weather, including why are people so interested in the weather? He maintains a weather station at Lundie near Dundee.

He wrote a famous article called Promises, Promises in which he argued that cognitive neuropsychologists have increasingly deviated from the original goals and methods of the subject.

The Psychology of Language
One of Harley's most famous publications is the book The Psychology of Language. In this book, he discusses psycholinguistics, which is the study of relationships that exist between linguistic behaviour and psychological processes. Harley discusses both the low cognitive level processes, including speech and visual word recognition, and the high cognitive level processes that are involved in comprehension. The text covers recent connectionist models of language, describing complex ideas in a clear and approachable manner. Following a strong developmental theme, the text describes how children acquire language (sometimes more than one), and also how they learn to read.

Selected publications
 Harley, T. A. (2014). The Psychology of Language: From data to theory (4th. ed.) Hove: Psychology Press. (Earlier editions 2008, 2001, 1995.)
 Harley, T.A. (2010). Psycholinguistics. (6 volumes) London: SAGE.
 Harley, T.A. (2009). Talking the talk: Language, Psychology and Science. Hove: Psychology press.
 Harley, T.A. (2006). Speech errors: Psycholinguistic approach. K. Brown (Ed.), The Encyclopaedia of Language and Linguistics (2nd. Ed., Vol. 11: pp. 739–744), Oxford: Elsevier.
 Harley, T.A., Jessiman, L.J., MacAndrew, S.B.G., & Astell, A.J. (2008). I don't know what I know: Evidence of preserved semantic knowledge but impaired metalinguistic knowledge in adults with probable Alzheimer's disease. Aphasiology, 22, 321-335.
 Harley, T. A., & O'Mara, D. A. (2006). Hyphenation can improve reading in acquired phonological dyslexia. Aphasiology, 20, 744-761.
 Harley, T. A., & Grant, F. (2004). The role of functional and perceptual attributes: Evidence from picture naming in dementia. Brain and Language, 91, 223-234.
 Harley, T. A. (2004). Does cognitive neuropsychology have a future?  Lead article in a special issue of Cognitive Neuropsychology, 21, 3-16.
 Astell, A. J. & Harley, T. A. (2002). Accessing semantic knowledge in dementia: Evidence from a word definition task. Brain and Language, 82, 312-326.
 Harley, T. A. (2003). Nice weather for the time of year: The British obsession with the weather. In S. Strauss & B. Orlove (Eds.), Weather, climate, culture (pp. 103–118). Oxford: Berg Publishers.
 Harley, T. A., & MacAndrew, S. B. G. (2001). Constraints upon word substitution speech errors. Journal of Psycholinguistic Research, 30, 395-418.
 Vousden, J., Brown, G. D. A., & Harley, T. A. (2000). Oscillator-based control of the serial ordering of phonology in speech production.  Cognitive Psychology, 41, 101-175.
 Harley, T. A., & Bown, H. (1998). What causes tip-of-the-tongue states? British Journal of Psychology, 89, 151-174.
 Astell, A. J., & Harley, T. A. (1998). Naming problems in dementia: Semantic or lexical? Aphasiology, 12, 357-374.
 Harley, T. A. (1993). Phonological activation of semantic competitors during lexical access in speech production. Language and Cognitive Processes, 8, 291-309.
 Harley, T. A. (1990). Environmental contamination of normal speech.  Applied Psycholinguistics, 11, 45-72.
 Harley, T. A. (1984). A critique of top-down independent levels models of speech production: Evidence from non-plan-internal speech errors.  Cognitive Science, 8, 191-219.

References

External links
 
 Academic Homepage at the School of Psychology, University of Dundee, retrieved 15 July 2008
 http://news.bbc.co.uk/1/low/scotland/tayside_and_central/7521264.stm for information on research into memory loss in Alzheimer's disease.

1958 births
Living people
British psychologists
Academics of the University of Dundee
Alumni of St John's College, Cambridge
Experimental psychologists
Cognitive psychologists
Psycholinguists
English meteorologists